Rafail Vergoyazov (born September 17, 1993 in Ust Kamenogorsk) is a Kazakhstani slalom canoer. At the 2012 Summer Olympics he competed in the Men's slalom C-1 but did not advance to the semifinals after finishing 17th in the qualifying round.

References

External links
Sports-Reference.com profile

Kazakhstani male canoeists
1993 births
Living people
Sportspeople from Oskemen
Olympic canoeists of Kazakhstan
Canoeists at the 2012 Summer Olympics
Canoeists at the 2010 Asian Games
Asian Games competitors for Kazakhstan
21st-century Kazakhstani people